is a Japanese politician who was Secretary General of the Liberal Democratic Party from 2010 to 2012.

Early life and career
He was born in Zushi, Kanagawa, the son of author and former Tokyo governor Shintaro Ishihara. He attended Keio Gijuku High School and graduated from the literature faculty of Keio University in 1981. After university, he worked as a political reporter for Nippon Television, covering the Finance and Foreign Ministries and the Prime Minister.

In 1990 he was elected to the House of Representatives as representative for the Fourth District of Tokyo under the Liberal Democratic Party (LDP) ticket. He was appointed Parliamentary Vice-Minister of International Trade and Industry in 1996. Under Junichiro Koizumi's first Cabinet in 2001, he became Minister of State for Administrative and Regulatory Reform. He served as Minister of Land, Infrastructure and Transport from 2003 to 2004, and was chairman of the Highways Committee of the LDP Policy Affairs Research Council from 2005 to 2007.

Following Prime Minister Yasuo Fukuda's resignation, Ishihara stood as a candidate for the LDP presidency. In the leadership election, held on September 22, 2008, Taro Aso won with 351 of the 527 votes; Ishihara placed fourth with 37 votes.

Ishihara was named as a potential LDP candidate for the 2014 gubernatorial election in Tokyo, but along with fellow LDP legislators Yuriko Koike, Tamayo Marukawa and Satsuki Katayama, performed poorly in a December 2013 poll against Yoichi Masuzoe and Hideo Higashikokubaru.

Ishihara is currently head of the Kinmirai Seiji Kenkyūkai faction of the LDP.

He lost his seat in the 2021 Japanese general election. After the elections, he was appointed as an advisor to the Kishida Cabinet, but he resigned after a week when it emerged the local LDP chapter he heads, had received subsidies intended for businesses affected by the COVID-19 pandemic.

References 

|-

|-

|-

|-

|-

|-

|-

|-

1957 births
Living people
People from Zushi, Kanagawa
Politicians from Kanagawa Prefecture
Keio University alumni
Members of the House of Representatives from Tokyo
Ministers of Land, Infrastructure, Transport and Tourism of Japan
Liberal Democratic Party (Japan) politicians
Shintaro Ishihara
21st-century Japanese politicians
Environment ministers of Japan